The 1995 Brentwood Borough Council election took place on 4 May 1995 to elect members of the Brentwood Borough Council in England.

Results summary

Ward results

Brentwood North

Brentwood South

Brentwood West

Brizes & Doddinghurst

Herongate & Ingrave

Hutton East

Hutton North

Hutton South

Ingatestone & Fryerning

Mountnessing

Pilgrims Hatch

Shenfield

Warley

References
2. "Election results from previous years " .brentwood.gov.uk

1995
1995 English local elections